The viper moray (Enchelynassa formosa or Enchelynassa canina) is a species of saltwater eel, the only member of the genus Enchelynassa of the family Muraenidae (Moray eels).  It is found in the Indo-Pacific oceans. It can grow up to 250 cm.

References

 

Muraenidae
Fish of Hawaii
Fish described in 1824